Anthriscus (chervils) is a common plant genus of the family Apiaceae, growing in Europe and temperate parts of Asia. It comprises 15 species. The genus grows in meadows and verges on slightly wet porous soils. One species, Anthriscus cerefolium is cultivated and used in the kitchen to flavor foods.

Anthriscus species are used as food plants by the larvae of some Lepidoptera species including the mouse moth (recorded on cow parsley).

The hollow stem is erect and branched, ending in compound umbels of small white or greenish flowers. The leaves are bipinnate or tripinnate.

Species of Anthriscus
 Anthriscus africana Hook. f. (Africa)
 Anthriscus caucalis M. Bieb. - Bur chervil (native to Africa and Eurasia, introduced elsewhere)
 Anthriscus cerefolium (L.) Hoffm. - Garden chervil, French parsley (native to Eurasia, introduced elsewhere)
 Anthriscus fumarioides (Waldst. & Kit.) Spreng. (Albania, Greece, Italy, Yugoslavia)
 Anthriscus glacialis Lipsky (Kazakhstan, Kyrgyzstan, Tajikistan)
 Anthriscus kotschyi Fenzl ex Boiss. (Transcaucasus, Turkey)
 Anthriscus lamprocarpa Boiss. (Lebanon, Syria, Palestine, Turkey) 
 Anthriscus mollis Boiss. & Reut.
 Anthriscus nemorosa (M. Bieb.) Spreng (Africa and Eurasia)
 Anthriscus nitida (Wahlenb.) Garcke (Europe)
 Anthriscus ruprechtii Boiss. (Transcaucasus, Turkey) 
 Anthriscus schmalhausenii (Albov) Koso-Pol. (Transcaucasus)
 Anthriscus sylvestris (L.) Hoffm. - Wild chervil (native to Africa and Eurasia, introduced elsewhere)
 Anthriscus tenerrima Boiss. & Spruner (Greece, Turkey)
 Anthriscus velutinus Sommier & Levier (Transcaucasus)

Etymology
The name is from the Latin Anthriscus and Greek anthriskos, names for chervil, and may be connected to the Greek athēr'', the "beard" of grain.

References

External links
Anthriscus Plant Information
Invasive Weed Warning for Wild Chervil

Apioideae
Apioideae genera